Tranny Fag is a 2018 Brazilian documentary film directed by Claudia Priscilla and Kiko Goifman about Linn da Quebrada, a transgender Brazilian musician and activist whose tactics for confronting homophobia and transphobia include performing in the nude.

The film had its theatrical premiere at the 2018 Berlin International Film Festival, where it won a Teddy Award as the best LGBTQ-themed documentary film of the festival.

References

External links
 

2018 films
2018 documentary films
Brazilian documentary films
2010s Portuguese-language films
Brazilian LGBT-related films
Transgender-related documentary films
2018 LGBT-related films